The Mini Coupé and Mini Roadster are two-seater sports cars that were engineered and manufactured by Mini between 2011 and 2015.

The hardtop Coupé was unveiled in June 2011 and formally launched at the Frankfurt Motor Show in September 2011. Production was shown in the 2011 documentary Megafactories. It is the first two-seater Mini. It was joined by a convertible version called Mini Roadster in 2012, following its showing as a concept car in 2009. The Coupé is known by the internal code R58 and the Roadster by code R59.

In February 2015 Mini announced the end of production for both models.

Coupé

The Coupé (Coupe in the US), which went on sale in the UK from 1 October 2011,
The Coupé’s windscreen is angled rearwards by 13 degrees more than in the cabrio’s and the roof is  lower than standard Mini Hatch. The rear spoiler rises automatically at speeds above . or with the use a toggle switch above the rear view mirror.

The range of the Coupé follows a similar pattern to other Mini models; featuring Cooper, Cooper S, Cooper SD and the range-topping John Cooper Works (JCW). The Cooper SD is a 2.0 L turbo diesel producing  available in some markets. All are equipped with a six-speed manual gearbox with the option of six-speed Steptronic automatic.

Roadster

The Mini Roadster is the convertible version of the Coupé and was first shown at the Frankfurt Motor Show in September 2009 as a concept, and formally launched at the Detroit North American International Auto Show in January 2012.

The range of models and engines mirrors the Mini Coupé with a range of 1.6 L petrol engines in various levels of power and a 2.0 L diesel engine offered in some markets.

Depending on the market, the soft top is either manually or electrically operated. The electrically operated top required the driver to unlock it and then could be opened using a toggle switch above the rear view mirror. Once fully open the top would sit flat behind the driver, a significant change from the R57 Convertible, which stowed the convertible top within view above the "boot." The convertible top included a rear window but did not include a window behind the driver's door. The soft top was only available in black.

References

Mini (BMW) vehicles
Front-wheel-drive sports cars
Sport compact cars
Coupés
Roadsters
Cars introduced in 2011
Vehicles discontinued in 2016